Avryuztamak (Äwreztamaq) is a rural locality (a village) in Nizhneavryuzovsky Selsoviet, Alsheyevsky District, Bashkortostan, Russia. The population was 68 as of 2010. There are 2 streets.

Geography 
Avryuztamak is located 21 km south of Rayevsky (the district's administrative centre) by road. Dim is the nearest rural locality.

References 

Rural localities in Alsheyevsky District